Jorge Eduardo Álvarez Guerrero (born May 30, 1990), commonly known as Koke Álvarez, is a Chilean former footballer who played as a midfielder or winger.

Career
He began his career as a youth player (U-14, U-16, U-20) in Club Deportivo Universidad Católica, one of the biggest teams in Chile.  At the beginning of 2010, he joined Curicó Unido as one of the young talents in the squad.  Right now, he is still playing with the Chilean Primera División B Clausura 2011 under the lead manager Raúl Toro Fuenzalida.

National team
Jorge was part of the National Team U-15 in 2004.

References

External links
1.   Football Lineups (Jorge Alvarez Statistics)

2.   Asociación de Fútbol Profesional de Chile, Curicó Unido

3.   ArceSports (Jorge Alvarez official agent)

4.   Curicó Unido

1990 births
Living people
People from Curicó
Chilean footballers
Primera B de Chile players
Segunda División Profesional de Chile players
Curicó Unido footballers
Deportes Colchagua footballers
Deportes Santa Cruz footballers
Association football midfielders